Ceiba pentandra is a tropical tree of the order Malvales and the family Malvaceae (previously emplaced in the family Bombacaceae), native to Mexico, Central America and the Caribbean, northern South America, and (as the variety C. pentandra var guineensis) West Africa. A somewhat smaller variety was introduced to South and Southeast Asia, where it is cultivated.

The tree and the cotton-like fluff obtained from its seed pods are commonly known in English as kapok, a Malay-derived name which originally applied to Bombax ceiba, a native of tropical Asia. In Spanish-speaking countries the tree is commonly known as "ceiba" and in French-speaking countries as fromager. The tree is cultivated for its cottonlike seed fibre, particularly in south-east Asia, and is also known as the Java cotton, Java kapok, silk-cotton or samauma.

Characteristics

These very large trees are in the Neotropics or tropical Africa. The Southeast Asian form of C. pentandra only reaches .

The trunk and many of the larger branches are often crowded with large simple thorns.

The trees produce several hundred  pods containing seeds surrounded by a fluffy, yellowish fibre that is a mix of lignin and cellulose.

The referenced reports make it clear that C. pentandra is among the largest trees in the world.

Uses

The commercial tree is most heavily cultivated in the rainforests of Asia, notably in Java (hence one of its common names), the Philippines, Malaysia, and Hainan Island in China, as well as in South America.

The flowers are an important source of nectar and pollen for honey bees and bats.

Bats are the primary pollinators of the night-blooming flowers.

Native tribes along the Amazon River harvest the fibre to wrap around their blowgun darts. The fibres create a seal that allows the pressure to force the dart through the tube.

The fiber is light, very buoyant, resilient, resistant to water, but very flammable. The process of harvesting and separating the fiber is labor-intensive and menial. It is difficult to spin, but is used as an alternative to down as filling in mattresses, pillows, upholstery, zafus, and stuffed toys such as teddy bears, and for insulation. It was previously much used in life jackets and similar devices until synthetic materials largely replaced the fiber. The seeds produce an oil that is used locally in soap and can be used as fertilizer.

Traditional medicinal uses
Ceiba pentandra bark decoction has been used as a diuretic, as an aphrodisiac, and to treat headache, as well as type II diabetes. It is used as an additive in some versions of the psychedelic drink Ayahuasca.

Seed oil
A vegetable oil can be pressed from the seeds. The oil has a yellow colour and a pleasant, mild odour and taste, resembling cottonseed oil. It becomes rancid quickly when exposed to air. Kapok oil is produced in India, Indonesia and Malaysia. It has an iodine value of 85–100; this makes it a nondrying oil, which means that it does not dry out significantly when exposed to air. The oil has some potential as a biofuel and in paint preparation.

Religion and folklore
The tree is a sacred symbol in Maya mythology.

It is a sacred tree in Palo, Arará and Santería.

According to the folklore of Trinidad and Tobago, the Castle of the Devil is a huge C. pentandra growing deep in the forest in which Bazil the demon of death was imprisoned by a carpenter. The carpenter tricked the devil into entering the tree in which he carved seven rooms, one above the other, into the trunk. Folklore claims that Bazil still resides in that tree.

Most masks coming from Burkina Faso, especially those of Bobo and Mossi people, are carved from C. pentandra timber.

Symbolism
Ceiba pentandra is the national emblem of Guatemala, Puerto Rico, and Equatorial Guinea. It appears on the coat of arms and flag of Equatorial Guinea.

The Cotton Tree is a landmark in downtown Freetown, Sierra Leone, and is considered a symbol of freedom for the slaves that immigrated there.

Saigon, one of a number of older names for Ho Chi Minh City, may be derived from Sài (Sino-Vietnamese "palisade" etc.) and the Vietnamese name for the Kapok tree (bông) gòn, although, in this instance, the tree intended may well be, not the New World Ceiba pentandra, but the Old World Bombax ceiba.

Gallery

See also
The Great Kapok Tree
Xtabay
Parque de la Ceiba
Fiber crop

References

External links

Kapok Fibers 
Seed Fibers 
Germplasm Resources Information Network: Ceiba pentandra 
Ceiba pentandra in Brunken, U., Schmidt, M., Dressler, S., Janssen, T., Thombiano, A. & Zizka, G. 2008. West African plants – A Photo Guide. Forschungsinstitut Senckenberg, Frankfurt/Main.

pentandra
Crops originating from the Americas
Fiber plants
National symbols of Equatorial Guinea
National symbols of Guatemala
National symbols of Puerto Rico
Plants described in 1791
Taxa named by Carl Linnaeus
Trees of Africa
Trees of Mexico
Trees of South America